Koshiō Shrine (古四王神社, Koshiō jinja) is a Shinto shrine located in Akita, Akita Prefecture, Japan. It enshrines the kami of Ōhiko no mikoto (大彦命) and Takemikazuchi no mikoto (武甕槌命). Its annual festival takes place on May 8. According to legend, was established in 658.

See also 
List of Shinto shrines in Japan

External links 
Akita Jinjacho website

Shinto shrines in Japan
Beppyo shrines